Hardtbach (also: Rheindorfer Bach, Dransdorfer Bach, Alte Bach) is a river of North Rhine-Westphalia, Germany. It is a left tributary of the Rhine near Bonn.

See also
List of rivers of North Rhine-Westphalia

References

Rivers of North Rhine-Westphalia
Rivers of Germany